Peter Gantzler (born 28 September 1958) is a Danish actor. He is perhaps best known for his parts in Taxa and Italian for Beginners.

Biography
Peter Gantzler originally studied Danish at the University of Copenhagen, but changed to the Danish National School of Theatre where he got his degree in 1990. He has performed on various theaters in the Copenhagen area, but is primarily known from television and movies.

He is married to actress Xenia Lach-Nielsen, with whom he has a daughter.

Filmography 
Rocking Silver (1983)
Mord i mørket (1986)
Kaj's fødselsdag (1990)
Operation Cobra (1995)
Davids bog (1996)
Smilla's Sense of Snow (1997)
Når mor kommer hjem (1998)
Mimi og madammerne (1998)
Pizza King (1999)
In China They Eat Dogs (1999)
Help! I'm a Fish (voice in Danish language original - 2000)
Italian for Beginners (2000)
Anja & Viktor (2001)
At klappe med een hånd (2001)
Min søsters børn (2001)
Listetyven (2002)
Bjergkuller (2002)
Campingvognen (2002)
Min søsters børn i sneen - (2002)
Til højre ved den gule hund (2003)
Fakiren fra Bilbao (2004)
Store planer (2005)
Solkongen (2005)
Steget efter (2005)
Dommeren (2005)
Direktøren for det hele (2006)
Små mirakel och stora (2006)
Tempelriddernes skat (2006)
A Viking Saga (2007)
33 Scenes from Life (2008)

Television 
Mørklægning (1992)
Kald mig Liva (1992)
Tre ludere og en lommetyv (1993)
Taxa (1997)
Hjerteflimmer (1998)
Turbulent sone (2000)
Skjulte spor (2000)
Den serbiske dansker (2001)
Er du skidt, skat? (2003)
Krøniken (2004-2005)
The Last Kingdom (2015)

Awards 
2001: Best actor (Valladolid International Film Festival), Robert for best supporting actor, best actor (Bordeaux International Festival of Women in Cinema) - all for the portrayal of Jørgen Mortensen in Italian for Beginners.

External links 

1958 births
Living people
Danish male film actors
Danish male voice actors
Danish male television actors